Darius Scholtysik (born 4 August 1966) is a German football coach and former player. As a player, he spent three seasons in the Bundesliga with Bayer 05 Uerdingen. He works as assistant coach at FC Zürich.

References

External links

1966 births
Living people
Sportspeople from Zabrze
German footballers
Association football midfielders
Bundesliga players
Eintracht Braunschweig players
Arminia Bielefeld players
KFC Uerdingen 05 players
Sportfreunde Siegen players
German football managers
Eintracht Braunschweig non-playing staff
German expatriate footballers
German expatriate sportspeople in Belgium
Expatriate footballers in Belgium